7958 Leakey, provisional designation , is a Hungaria asteroid and synchronous binary system from the inner regions of the asteroid belt, approximately 3 kilometers in diameter.

It was discovered on 5 June 1994, by American astronomer-couple Carolyn and Eugene Shoemaker at the Palomar Observatory in California, United States.  Its minor-planet moon was discovered in 2012. The asteroid was named after the members of the Leakey family: Mary, Louis and Richard.

Orbit and classification 

Leakey is a member of the Hungaria family, which form the innermost dense concentration of asteroids in the Solar System. It orbits the Sun in the inner main-belt at a distance of 1.7–2.0 AU once every 2 years and 7 months (939 days). Its orbit has an eccentricity of 0.08 and an inclination of 22° with respect to the ecliptic.

Physical characteristics 

Leakey is an assumed E-type asteroid.

Lightcurves 

In 2012, and 2015, several lightcurves of Leakey were obtained by astronomers Brian Warner, Robert Stephens and Daniel Coley. Lightcurve analysis gave a concurring and well-defined rotation period of 2.35 hours with a brightness variation between 0.19 and 0.22 magnitude.

Diameter and albedo 

According to the survey carried out by the NEOWISE mission of NASA's Wide-field Infrared Survey Explorer, Leakey measures 2.94 kilometers in diameter and its surface has a high albedo of 0.468.

The Collaborative Asteroid Lightcurve Link  assumes an albedo of 0.30 – a compromise value between 0.4 and 0.2, corresponding to the Hungaria asteroids both as family and orbital group – and calculates a diameter of 3.35 kilometers based on an absolute magnitude of 14.3.

Moon 

The 2012-photometric lightcurve observation also revealed, that Leakey is a synchronous binary asteroid with a minor-planet moon orbiting it every 50.24 hours. The moon (secondary) was designated .

It is likely that the secondary body is tidally locked, which means that its rotation is synchronous with its orbital period.

Naming 

The minor planet is named after the Leakey's, a family of Kenyan paleoanthropologists: Mary Leakey (1913–1996), her husband Louis Leakey (1903–1972), and their son Richard Leakey (born 1944). Working for many years in Tanzania and Kenya, they conclusively proved that human evolution began in Africa rather than Asia. Richard explored the Koobi Fora archaeological site in Kenya, where many Hominin fossils have been found. The approved naming citation was published by the Minor Planet Center on 11 April 1998.

Notes

References

External links 
 Asteroids with Satellites, Robert Johnston, johnstonsarchive.net
 Asteroid Lightcurve Database (LCDB), query form (info )
 Dictionary of Minor Planet Names, Google books
 Asteroids and comets rotation curves, CdR – Observatoire de Genève, Raoul Behrend
 Discovery Circumstances: Numbered Minor Planets (5001)-(10000) – Minor Planet Center
 
 

007958
Discoveries by Carolyn S. Shoemaker
Discoveries by Eugene Merle Shoemaker
Named minor planets
007958
19940605